The 1979–80 Atlanta Flames season was the eighth and final season in Atlanta for the franchise. The franchise was bought and moved to Calgary, Alberta to become the Calgary Flames.

Offseason
Al MacNeil left his position as head coach of the Canadiens farm club, the Nova Scotia Voyageurs, to become head coach of the Atlanta Flames.
Boom Boom Geoffrion left his position as a broadcaster with the Flames to become the head coach of the Montreal Canadiens.

Regular season

Final standings

Schedule and results

Player statistics

Skaters
Note: GP = Games played; G = Goals; A = Assists; Pts = Points; PIM = Penalty minutes

†Denotes player spent time with another team before joining Atlanta.  Stats reflect time with the Flames only.
‡Traded mid-season.

Goaltending
Note: GP = Games played; TOI = Time on ice (minutes); W = Wins; L = Losses; OT = Overtime/shootout losses; GA = Goals against; SO = Shutouts; GAA = Goals against average

Transactions
The Flames were involved in the following transactions during the 1979–80 season.

Trades

Free agents

Expansion draft

Draft picks

References
 Flames on Hockey Database

Atlanta
Atlanta
Atlanta Flames seasons